Park Si-eun is a Korean name consisting of the surname Park and the given name Si-eun, and may also refer to:

 Park Si-eun (actress) (born 1980), South Korean actress
 Park Si-eun (entertainer) (born 2001), South Korean actress and member of STAYC